Raj Bhavan (Tamil Nadu), literally the "Governor's Residence," is the official residence of the governor of Tamil Nadu. It is located in Chennai, the capital city of Tamil Nadu.

History
The earliest official residence of the Governors of Madras were in Fort St. George, the first one built in the 1640s on what is now the Parade Square. This was pulled down in 1693 and a new one built eastwards where, in later years, it became the core of the Secretariat. When the Governor’s garden house, was destroyed by the French in 1746, a new garden house was acquired for the Governor after the French withdrawal in 1749. A house, which belonged to Antonia de Madeiros, a member of perhaps the richest family of the time, became the core of Government House around which developed what is now called Government Estate. In 1820 Governor Thomas Munro (1820–1827) made Government House the official residence. Today it is called Raj Bhavan although previously it was known as Guindy Lodge, the Governor’s country house.

Guindy Lodge, it is believed, was built by Governor William Langhorne (1672–1678) in the early 1670s in garden space carved out of the Guindy Forest that had helped make St. Thomas’ mount a salubrious place for rest and recreation. When Langhorne left in 1678, he sold the property to the then Chief Merchant of Madras, Beri Chinna Venkatadri, the younger brother of one of the founders of the city, Beri Thimappa. When Chinna Venkatadri had problems with the East India Company, he gifted Guindy Lodge to the Company’s Madras Government.

Area of Raj Bhavan
Raj Bhavan is situated in the Guindy Park Reserved Forest Area. The blackbuck, a near-threatened species of antelope, was introduced to Guindy Park by Lord Willingdon in 1924.

 1958: transferred to the Union Education Ministry for locating the Indian Institute of Technology, Madras
 1958: transferred To the Forest Department for Deer Park and Children’s Park at the instance of the then Prime Minister of India, Jawaharlal Nehru
 1974: transferred for Rajaji Memorial
 1975: transferred for Kamaraj Memorial
 1977: transferred to the Forest Department to become a national park

There are also two pieces of land near the Adyar River Bed and in Ikkadu Thangal, respectively, totalling , belonging to Raj Bhavan. This is where water pumping stations that supply water to Raj Bhavan are located. The Chennai Raj Bhavan is regarded as one of the largest Raj Bhavans in the country.

In and around Raj Bhavan, it has deer (spotted deer, black buck and albino), mongoose, jackals, many varieties of reptiles and a large number of birds like partridges, pheasants, parrots, quail, paradise fly-catcher, etc. Bird watchers have noticed migratory birds here. Used as a government ‘country house’ till the area was ravaged by the French and Mysore in the 18th century, Guindy lodge then passed into private hands at the beginning of the 19th century. The first private owner mentioned is Mr. Gilbert Ricketts of Madras, who in 1813, was seeking a loan from the government bank. When Ricketts died intestate in December, 1817, with the property heavily mortgaged to the Bank and one Mr. Griffiths, the estate devolved on the Registrar of the Supreme Court as administrator. Protracted legal proceedings favoured the Bank which, thereafter, in 1821, offered the property to the Government for a sum of 10,000 pagodas (or Rs.35,000). Government also acquired an adjacent property for Rs.8,750 from the merchant Joseph Nazar Shawmier. Between 1821 and 1824, Government linked the two properties with a third purchaser and the Raj Bhavan property as it existed at Independence came into being.

See also
 Government Houses of the British Indian Empire
 List of Tamil Nadu Government Estates, Complexes, Buildings and Structures

References

External links
The Official Web Site of Governor of Tamil Nadu

Governors' houses in India
Government buildings in Tamil Nadu
Buildings and structures in Chennai